Francesc Montañés Roca (born 9 January 1990) is a retired Spanish tennis player and a padel coach.

Montañés had a career high ATP singles ranking of 1186 achieved on 15 August 2011. He also had a career high ATP doubles ranking of 1075 achieved on 25 July 2011.

Montañés made his ATP main draw debut at the 2011 Grand Prix Hassan II in the doubles draw partnering his brother Albert.

As a junior player, in 2006, Montañés clinched the Spanish national tournament for under-15 boys, and took part in the Junior Davis Cup Finals held in Barcelona.

ATP Challenger and ITF Futures Finals

Doubles: 1 (0–1)

Notes

References

External links

1990 births
Living people
Spanish male tennis players
People from Montsià
Sportspeople from the Province of Tarragona
Tennis players from Catalonia
21st-century Spanish people